is a Japanese actress. She starred in the 1976–1977 NHK daytime television series (asadora) Hi no Kuni ni, and has had multiple guest-star roles in prime-time jidaigeki such as Mito Kōmon and Abarenbō Shōgun. She has also appeared as a voice actor in a 1982 production of Aladdin and the Magic Lamp. Keiko has also appeared in film.

Tokusatsu
 Ninja Sentai Kakuranger: Rokurokubi (ep, 1 - 2)

References

External links
鈴鹿景子事務所／リン・ルゥ・カーニバル (professional web site)

Japanese actresses
1955 births
Living people
People from Ishinomaki
Actors from Miyagi Prefecture